Kékesd is a village in Baranya county, Hungary.

External links 
http://www.kekesd.hu 

Populated places in Baranya County